The International School of Hellerup, formerly Østerbro International School, is an IB World School, offering the IB Primary Years Programme, IB Middle Years Programme, and IB Diploma Programs. It is located on Rygårds Allé 131, in Hellerup, Copenhagen. It was previously located in the Østerbro district of Copenhagen, Denmark.  

It has over 500 students from Pre-kindergarten to DP2 (also known as 12th grade).

External links
 Official website

Primary schools in Copenhagen
International Baccalaureate schools in Denmark
Buildings and structures in Østerbro